They Will Return is the second studio album by the Finnish melodic death metal band, Kalmah. It was released by Spinefarm Records on 30 April 2002. This is the first studio album to feature bassist Timo Lehtinen and drummer Janne Kusmin.

Track listing

Personnel
 Pekka Kokko − rhythm guitar, lead guitar and vocals
 Antti Kokko − lead guitar
 Timo Lehtinen − bass guitar
 Pasi Hiltula − keyboard
 Janne Kusmin − drums

Production
Produced and engineered by Ahti Kortelainen
Mastered by Mika Jussila

References

Kalmah albums
2002 albums
Spinefarm Records albums